Jordan Peter Murrell (born May 2, 1993) is a Canadian professional soccer player.

Club career

Early career
Murrell began playing soccer at age four with Pinnstars FC in London.

Murrell spent 2009–2011 with Toronto FC's academy in the Canadian Soccer League. Began his young career in the U16's of the academy before getting promoted to the U18's in 2010. After strong years within the academy, he became captain of the U18 side in 2011.

In 2011, Murrell committed to playing four years of college soccer at Syracuse University between 2011 and 2014 earning many accolades.

While at college, Murrell played with USL PDL side Ocean City Nor'easters in 2013 and K-W United FC in 2014.

Real Monarchs
On January 20, 2015, Murrell was selected in the third round (57th overall) of the 2015 MLS SuperDraft by Real Salt Lake.

Murrell signed with Salt Lake's USL side Real Monarchs SLC on March 16, 2015. In 2015, the club declined 8 options, including Murrell.

Pittsburgh Riverhounds
After training with the club for most of preseason, Murrell signed with the Pittsburgh Riverhounds on March 24, 2016.

Reno 1868
In December 2016, Murrell signed with USL expansion side Reno 1868 FC. In July 2017, he would score twice in a 9–0 rout over LA Galaxy II. Murrell would appear in 27 games for the club that season, a new career high.

Upon completion of the 2017 season, Reno 1868 announced that they had re-signed Murrell for the 2018 season. Murrell was released by Reno on December 3, 2018.

Valour FC
On January 8, 2019 Murrell returned to Canada, signing a multi-year contract with Valour FC in the Canadian Premier League. He made his debut for Valour on May 1 against Pacific FC. On August 13 Murrell was suspended 6 games after an altercation with the referee on August 5 during a match against HFX Wanderers which included him kicking over a table as he left the field. On January 17, 2020 Valour announced they had released Murrell from his contract.

Las Vegas Lights
On January 31, 2020, Murrell joined USL Championship side Las Vegas Lights.

International career
In January 2011, Murrell made his first appearance for Canada's U18 national team in a training camp that was held in Costa Rica. He played in a pair of friendlies scoring in a friendly vs Costa Rica U18 national team
Later in 2011, December Murrell was called for Canada's U18 national team to train in a USA based camp.

In July 2012, Murrell was called up for a Canada U20 national team camp. Murrell captained the team in one of friendlies vs Mexico's U20 national team while appearing in both.

In February 2013, Murrell was named to Canada's squad for the 2013 CONCACAF U20 Championship.

In May 2016, Murrell was called to Canada's U23 national team for a pair of friendlies against Guyana and Grenada. He saw action in both matches.

Personal life
Murrell was born in London to English parents. At age 11, he and his family moved to Markham, Canada.

References

External links

Syracuse Orange bio

1993 births
Living people
Association football defenders
Canadian soccer players
English footballers
Soccer people from Ontario
Footballers from Greater London
Sportspeople from Markham, Ontario
English emigrants to Canada
Naturalized citizens of Canada
Canadian expatriate soccer players
English expatriate footballers
Expatriate soccer players in the United States
Canadian expatriate sportspeople in the United States
English expatriate sportspeople in the United States
Toronto FC players
Syracuse Orange men's soccer players
Ocean City Nor'easters players
K-W United FC players
Real Salt Lake draft picks
Real Monarchs players
Pittsburgh Riverhounds SC players
Reno 1868 FC players
Valour FC players
Canadian Soccer League (1998–present) players
USL League Two players
USL Championship players
Canadian Premier League players
Canada men's youth international soccer players
Canada men's under-23 international soccer players
Las Vegas Lights FC players
Black Canadian soccer players
Black British sportspeople